Vaniyamkulam-I  is a town in the Palakkad district, state of Kerala, India. Together with Vaniyamkulam-II, it forms a part of the Vaniamkulam gram panchayat.

Demographics
 India census, Vaniyamkulam-I had a population of 14,402 with 6,855 males and 7,547 females.

References

Vaniyamkulam-I